Cédric Mongha Nabe (born 16 June 1983 in Dardagny) is a retired Swiss sprinter who specialized in the 100 metres and 200 metres.

Achievements

References

External links 

1983 births
Living people
Swiss male sprinters
Swiss people of Democratic Republic of the Congo descent
Doping cases in athletics
Swiss sportspeople in doping cases